Daniel ben Judah was a Jewish liturgical poet, who lived at Rome in the middle of the fourteenth century CE. He was the grandfather of Daniel ben Samuel ha-Rofe, rabbi at Tivoli. 
Religion 
  Religion  Encyclopedias almanacs transcripts and maps  Romano, Judah ben Moses ben Daniel

According to Luzzatto, Daniel ben Judah was the author of the well-known hymn Yigdal Elohim Hai containing the thirteen articles of belief of Maimonides. This poem, which forms part of the morning prayer among the Ashkenazim, and is sung by the Sephardim on the eve of Sabbaths and holy days, is included in the Romaniot ritual for Saturday evening.

14th-century Italian rabbis
Rabbis from Rome
Jewish poets
Writers from Rome